Manish Sisodia (born 5 January 1972) is an Indian politician and journalist who served as the 1st Deputy Chief Minister of Delhi from 2015 to 2023. He resigned following his arrest by the Central Bureau of Investigation, on corruption charges based on liquor scam. He represents the Patparganj constituency in Delhi Legislative Assembly since 2015 and from 2013 to 2014.

He was previously a cabinet minister in the Government of the NCT of Delhi between December 2013 and February 2014.Sisodia was a social activist and journalist. He is a member of the National Executive Committee of the Aam Aadmi Party (AAP) and is also a founding member of AAP.
Sisodia has written a book called 'Shiksha: My Experiments as an Education Minister', which chronicles the journey of education reforms in Delhi as being claimed by his party and has received wide acclaim for its practical insights on education transformation.

Early life and career
Manish Sisodia was born in a Hindu family of Phagauta village in Hapur district of Uttar Pradesh. Born to a father who was a public school teacher, he was enrolled into the government school in his village. Later, he commenced his career as a journalist after completing a diploma in journalism, awarded by Bharatiya Vidya Bhavan in 1993. Manish Sisodia also worked as radio jockey in FM radio station during his early career. He used to host several programs like "Zero Hour" for All India Radio in 1996 and then worked for Zee News as a reporter, news producer and news reader between 1997 and 2005.

Activism
Sisodia's association with the Chief Minister of Delhi and AAP's founding chief Arvind Kejriwal goes back to their time together as leaders of the non-profit Parivartan, founded by the latter to take up cases of citizens who struggled to engage with the government. After formally quitting journalism, Sisodia along with Kejriwal founded Kabir, a non-profit that organised public hearings with government officials and people. He was one of the key members of the group that drafted the Right to Information Act.

Subsequently, Sisodia became a key participant in the Anna Hazare led India Against Corruption movement of 2011 that sought a Jan Lokpal bill. He was involved in drafting the first version of that proposed legislation and was jailed for his involvement in protests.

Political career

Sisodia was one of the key founding members of the Aam Aadmi Party (AAP). He became a member of its Political Affairs Committee. He was elected as a Member of the Legislative Assembly in the December 2013 Delhi Assembly election, when he defeated Nakul Bhardwaj, a Bharatiya Janata Party candidate, by 11,476 votes in the Patparganj constituency of East Delhi. In the February 2015 Delhi Assembly election, which resulted in a landslide victory for AAP, he was again elected from Patparganj, defeating Vinod Kumar Binny of the Bharatiya Janata Party by over 28,761 votes. In 2020 Delhi Legislative Assembly election, he again defeated Ravinder Singh Negi, a BJP candidate by over 3000 votes.

Cabinet Minister, Delhi
He was a cabinet minister in all the three Kejriwal ministries and held the charge of below listed departments of the Government of Delhi during the Third Kejriwal Ministry-
 Finance.
 Education.
 Tourism.
 PWD.
 Labour
 Planning.
 Land & Building.
 Vigilance.
 Services.
 Art.
 Culture.
 Language.

He resigned from the cabinet on 28 February 2023, after being arrested by the Central Bureau of Investigation for the Delhi liquor policy scam.

As Cabinet Minister

Education reforms
When the AAP came to power in Delhi, Sisodia decided to bring in radical reforms to the ailing public education system. One of the first decisions he took as Delhi's Finance Minister in 2015 was to double the funding for the public education program. Every year since then, the Delhi government has allocated a quarter of its total budget to education, making it the highest proportion in the country. One of the most visible hallmarks of these reforms is the reconstructed building infrastructure: modern classrooms equipped with tech-based teaching aids, and also football fields, field hockey turfs, auditoriums and science laboratories. Delhi also has parent-led School Management Committees (School Boards), creating accountability structures within the communities that the school serves. Delhi government has successfully conducted several mega PTMs (Parent Teacher Meetings) which provided a space for the teachers and parents to engage in meaningful conversations for the betterment of students.
 
Under Sisodia's leadership, many interventions have happened inside the classrooms. Advanced teacher training modules that encourage educators to focus on learning outcomes have significantly bridged the learning deficit. The government has launched a statewide program, Mission Buniyaad, to improve the foundational learning outcomes of the students. Sisodia has experimented with new age curricula viz Happiness Curriculum and Entrepreneurship Mindset Curriculum and Deshbhakti Curriculum  which instill values and skills in the students and prepare them to live a happy, meaningful and productive life. The curricula is being implemented in all government and some private schools of Delhi to inculcate the right mindset among students by making them emotionally and professionally sound while becoming responsible citizens.
 
As a result of Sisodia's efforts, Delhi's education system has seen many positive changes. Since 2016, Delhi government schools have performed better than the private schools in 12th board examinations. There was a 20 per cent increase in the number of students between class three and five who can solve arithmetic division problems because of the effective implementation of Mission Buniyaad. Around 8 lakh students attend daily Happiness Classes, while around 7 lakh students are attending Entrepreneurship Classes which are impacting their mindsets and behaviour positively.

Further adding to the mindset curricula, Manish Sisodia has also introduced world’s largest student entrepreneurship program “Business Blasters”. The program empowers students to develop a job provider’s mindset by setting up their own businesses for which each student is provided seed money of Rs 2000. It is a multi-component intervention focused on experiential learning that includes field projects, interviews, classroom activities and live interaction with entrepreneurs. In its first edition of the Business Blasters program 126 students made it to the final round and exhibited their businesses at Business Blasters Expo- 2022 held on March 5, 2022.
 
In 2018, he delivered the keynote address at the Harvard India Conference at the Harvard Kennedy School on the Government's Education and Healthcare reforms. In 2017, he presented the Delhi Education model at the Global Education conference in Moscow, in front of educationists from 70 countries.

In December 2021, Manish Sisodia presented Mindset Curricula (Happiness, Entrepreneurship and Deshbhakti) at RewirEd Summit in Dubai, to the education fraternity from all across the world. In May 2022, he shared the story of ‘restoring the faith of Delhi people in the government school system’ in the presence of ministers and public representatives from over 100 countries at the Education World Forum-2022 in London, UK.

In 2021, he supported students to cancel CBSE Board Exam 2020-21 of Class 10 amid rising Covid-19 cases.

In August 2022, his education policy received acclaim from The New York Times.

Higher and Technical Education Reforms
Transformative changes by Manish Sisodia in the field of Education are not just limited to school education. He has taken many initiatives in the field of Higher and Technical Education that includes establishing three innovative new state universities- Delhi Skill and Entrepreneurship University (DSEU) in 2020, Delhi Sports University (DSU) in 2021  and Delhi Teachers University in 2022. In addition to this, the number of seats in state universities  have also been increased significantly to accommodate a larger population of students.

Economic reforms

During Sisodia’s tenure as the Finance Minister in Delhi, the government's budget has more than doubled in 7 years - from ₹30, 940 crores in 2014-15 to ₹ 75,800 crores in 2022-23. Such an increase was possible due to an increase in the tax base by ending the "Raid Raj" and plugging leaks. Sisodia has also started one of its kind Outcome Budget, which is one of the most comprehensive in India linking public spending to over 2,200 output indicators and 1,549 outcome indicators across 39 departments. This is considered as a revolutionary step in improving the political accountability of public finance. He is the only finance minister of any state to have presented eight consecutive budgets.

On 26 March 2022, he presented a budget of ₹75,800 crore in the Delhi Assembly. AAP leaders expected that the budget would create employment for 20 lakh people in Delhi in the upcoming five years.

Political and social views
In his budget speech for 2016–17, Sisodia said that the aim of the government is not spending the allocated money but ensuring that every rupee spent makes a difference in the lives of the people. He has said that elections should be fought on the agendas of education and health and not on caste and religion.

At the World Education Conference in Moscow in 2018, Sisodia said that the real contribution to society is the building of a quality education system in the country and the task of education is to equip the students to address present-day challenges, including terrorism, pollution, corruption and gender discrimination. In 2019, he said that students should be enabled to become job providers rather than job seekers. He has also said that India needs an education system which ensures a high minimum quality of education to all its students and not just 5% students who can afford to pay for it.

Corruption charges and arrest
In June 2022, a complaint was filed against Sisodia, about the construction of schools and classrooms with the Delhi Government's Anti-Corruption Branch (ACB). In July 2022, the anti-corruption authority Delhi Lokayukta was also investigating.

In July 2022, Delhi's Lieutenant Governor Vinai Kumar Saxena had recommended the Central Bureau of Investigation (CBI) to investigate the Excise Policy 2021-22 of Delhi Government. Saxena's action was based on a report submitted by Delhi Government Chief Secretary Naresh Kumar. On July 8, Kumar submitted a report to the Lieutenant-Governor’s Office, alleging procedural lapses in the implementation of the policy and claiming that post-tender benefits were extended to the licensees. CBI has started investigating the case. In response, Delhi CM Arvind Kejriwal accused the Central government of misusing the CBI to "derail Delhi’s education and health revolution". On 22 August, Sisodia said that he had a recording (the evidence of which was never made available in public domain) of an offer from the BJP to drop the cases against him in return for Sisodia splitting AAP.

Sisodia was arrested on 26 February 2023 in relation to the Excise Scam by CBI. The FIR said that Sisodia, former Delhi Excise Commissioner Arava Gopi Krishna, and two other senior excise department officials were "instrumental in recommending and taking decisions pertaining to excise policy for the year 2021-22 without the approval of competent authority with an intention to extend undue favours to the licensee post tender".

Following his arrest, on 28 February 2023 Sisodia and his cabinet colleague, Satyendar Jain (who was also arrested on corruption charges), resigned from their posts from the Third Kejriwal ministry. AAP and Manish Sisodia have strongly denied these charges as being politically motivated.

In an FIR dated 14 March 2023, the Central Bureau of Investigation registered an additional case against Sisodia in connection with the Delhi government's Feedback Unit (FBU).

Awards and recognition
 2016: listed among the 100 most influential Indians 2016 by The Indian Express
2017: awarded the "Finest Education Minister" award
2019: awarded the Champions of Change Award for his exceptional work in education sector in Delhi
 2021: honoured with the Mahatma award for promoting excellence in education; a global award to celebrate the work of social impact leaders and change-makers

Electoral performance

References

External links

Living people
Activists from Delhi
Freedom of information activists
Delhi MLAs 2013–2015
State cabinet ministers of Delhi
Delhi MLAs 2015–2020
Delhi MLAs 2020–2025
1972 births
Deputy Chief Ministers of Delhi
Aam Aadmi Party MLAs from Delhi